Ohlson is a surname of Swedish origin. It is a contraction of the surname Olofsson and it literally means "son of Olof". It may refer to

Bertil Ohlson, Swedish athlete
Carl-Erik Ohlson, Swedish athlete
Elisabeth Ohlson, Swedish photographer
Erik Ohlson, Swedish-born British shipping magnate
Olle Ohlson, Swedish athlete
Ollie Ohlson, New Zealand TV Personality
Ted Ohlson, Australian rules footballer

See also
Clas Ohlson, a Swedish retail company
Ohlson Baronets
Ohlsson
 Ohlsen

Swedish-language surnames
Patronymic surnames